Awakened is the sixth studio album by the American metalcore band As I Lay Dying. It is the final album released by the band before their hiatus in 2014. The album was released on September 25, 2012, through Metal Blade Records. The album was produced by Bill Stevenson (the drummer of the Descendents) and recorded at The Blasting Room in Fort Collins, Colorado and Lambesis Studios in San Diego, California. On June 22, 2012, the album title, release date, and first single were announced. On June 25, the first single "Cauterize" was released for free download and became available online for purchase the following day. On June 27, a lyric video for "Cauterize" was released along with album artwork, also the band created an event on Facebook inviting fans to participate in a music video shoot for "A Greater Foundation". Fans were able to pre-order a copy on the Rockstar Mayhem Festival tour of 2012.

The band has released clips of the album via SoundCloud, prior to the release date, and on September 11 the music video for "A Greater Foundation" was released.

Reception 

Overall reception towards the album has been positive.

Mark Fisher of Metal Forces gave the album an impressive 10/10.

Track listing

Personnel 
Production and performance credits are adapted from the album liner notes.

As I Lay Dying
 Tim Lambesis – lead vocals
 Nick Hipa – lead guitar, backing vocals
 Phil Sgrosso – rhythm guitar, backing vocals, acoustic guitar, keyboards on "Wasted Words"
 Josh Gilbert – bass, clean vocals
 Jordan Mancino – drums, backing vocals

Additional
 Joey Bradford – additional backing vocals, gang vocals
 Loniel Robinson – gang vocals
 Matt JR – gang vocals
 Lore JR – gang vocals
 Joey St. Lucas – gang vocals
 Amanda Dubord – gang vocals
 Vince Bifano – gang vocals
 Robert Pine – gang vocals
 Willow – gang vocals
 Matt Geise – gang vocals

Production
 Bill Stevenson – production, engineering,  gang vocals
 Jason Livermore – production, engineering
 Andrew Berlin – engineering
 Daniel Castleman – assisting engineering
 Chris Beeble – assisting engineering
 Colin Richardson – mixing
 Carl Bown – mix engineer
 Ted Jensen – mastering
 metastazis.com – artwork, layout
 Tiffanie Uldry – artwork, layout
 Ty Watkins – photography

Studios
 The Blasting Room, Fort Collins, Colorado – drums, guitars
 Lambesis Studios, San Diego – bass, vocals
 Echelon Studios – additional vocals
 Treehouse Studios, Derbyshire, UK – mixing
 Sterling Sound – mastering

Charts

References 

2012 albums
As I Lay Dying (band) albums
Metal Blade Records albums
Albums produced by Bill Stevenson (musician)